The Assistant may refer to:

 The Assistant (Walser novel) (German: Der Gehülfe), a 1908 novel by Robert Walser 
 The Assistant (novel), a 1957 novel by Bernard Malamud
 The Assistant (TV series), a satirical reality series starring Andy Dick.
 The Assistant (1982 film), a 1982 Czech film
 The Assistant (1998 film), a 1998 film
 The Assistant (2015 film), a 2015 film
 The Assistant (2019 film), a 2019 film
 The Assistant (2022 film), a 2022 Malaysian action film

See also
 Factotum (novel), a 1975 novel by Charles Bukowski